Cann may refer to:

Cann (surname), a list of people with the name
Cann River, a river of Victoria, Australia
Cann, Dorset, a village in England
Edward du Cann, British businessman and politician
Claire and Antoinette Cann pianists, known as the Cann Twins
Cann baronets, a former baronetcy

See also 
 Cann Hall, a district of the London Borough of Waltham Forest
 McCann (disambiguation)
 Kann (disambiguation)
 Can (disambiguation)
 Canne (disambiguation)
 Cannes, a city in France